Vicente Ndongo Muana (born 22 January 1992), sportingly known as Vicente, is an Equatoguinean retired futsal player, a former singer of hip hop and rhythm and blues and a current screenwriter and YouTuber who goes under the name Mostopapi. He has played as a pivot for the Equatorial Guinea national futsal team.

Early life
Ndongo was born in Malabo. He was moved to Spain at 2. He is based in Bilbao.

Futsal career
Ndongo capped for Equatorial Guinea at senior level during the 2016 Africa Futsal Cup of Nations qualification.

References

1992 births
Living people
Sportspeople from Malabo
Equatoguinean emigrants to Spain
Equatoguinean men's futsal players

Equatoguinean singers
African male singers

Hip hop singers

Rhythm and blues singers

Male screenwriters

Equatoguinean mass media people
Spanish-language YouTubers
YouTube vloggers
YouTube channels launched in 2011